Fifth Man may refer to:
"The Fifth Man" (Stargate SG-1), an episode of Stargate SG-1
The Fifth Man (novel), a novel by John B. Olson and Randall S. Ingermanson
the unknown member of the Cambridge Five (aka the Cambridge Four), a ring of Soviet spies